HDP is the debut album by the Czech hip hop group Prago Union, featuring former Chaozz members Skupla and Deph (aka Kato). The album was pressed as a 3-disk LP, and in an instrumental edition.

Track listing

"Intro" (featuring Dědek) 
"Kandidat vet" 
"Hadi pocty"
"Prylis dlouhey vikent"
"Kosh" 
"Bestiar"
"V.A.R." (featuring Phatski from Dixxx)
"Gold chain mew-zick II" (featuring Planet Asia)
"Zvyratka"
"Sklep!"
"Pecka s kurtem" (featuring Kutmasta Kurt & Admirál Kolíbal)
"Int'louda"
"Dlouhabezzastaveni (featuring De Zrechts)
"Verbalni attentat"
"Drym" (featuring Klárka & Architect)
"Beat & I / Ja und ich" (featuring Masta Ace & Dendemann)
"Stary pro novy (Ol' 4 tha new)" (featuring Ed O.G. & DJ Richard)
"Rapviem"
"Pulnocni beh" (Uprchlík Remix) (featuring Dědek)

2005 debut albums
Prago Union albums